is a Japanese male volleyball player and an Olympian. He plays as an Outside Hitter for Nippon Sport Science University's club, Japan men's national volleyball team and Pallavolo Padova.

Biography 

Ran has one brother, Rui, who is one and a half year older, and one younger sister, Riri. He started playing volleyball following the footsteps of his brother. His sister also plays volleyball. 

In November 2017, Rui tweeted that 
their mother is half Japanese, half American, with possible British and German ancestry.

Personal life 
He owns a YouTube Channel with his brother called RanRui which is a combination of their given names.

"Ran Takahashi the first photobook - the portraits of 20 years old" is his first photobook released on August 22, 2022.

Career

Elementary school years 
Ran started playing volleyball in his second grade of elementary school for the school's team.

High school years 
Ran played for Kyoto Municipal Hachigaoka Junior High School. Because of his height, in the first grade, he was mainly used as a Libero.

Afterward, he attended Higashiyama High School, and he was in the starting line up in high school since his first year and served as an ace and captain of his team by the third year. He led his team to the top 4 of the "Inter-High School Sports Festival." Furthermore, his team won the "National Sports Festival" of Japan as well as the winter 2020 All Japan High School Volleyball Championships, also known as "Haruko." In addition, he received the "Most Valuable Player" award at the end of the competition. 

He has no under category experience at all, but he was immediately elected as a senior representative in February 2020 while he was still in the 3rd grade of high school.

College years and oversea 
After graduating from high school, Ran entered Nippon Sport Science University. He led the team, receiving the runner-up place in the 2020 All Japan Intercollegiate Volleyball Championship, and got the Best Scorer award from the competition. In 2021, he was one of the Outside Hitter for the Japan men's national volleyball team in 2020 Summer Olympics.

After winning 2nd place at the Asian Men's Volleyball Championship with the Japan men's national volleyball team, he returned to play for his college team in the 2021 Kanto University Men's Division 1 League, winning 1st place by defeating Waseda University in straight sets. He also played for his college team in the 2021 All Japan Intercollegiate Volleyball Championship. Regrettably, they lost in the quarterfinals against Jutendo University in 5 sets. 

On November 29, it was reported that Ran would play in the Italian Volleyball League Division 1 with Pallavolo Padova. He flew to Italy on December 10 and his jersey number is 14, the same as Yūki Ishikawa's when he played with Padova. 

On December 19, he debuted in the highest Italian league as a substitute in the third set against Modena Volley. 

Pallavolo Padova announced that Ran has renewed his contract with the club for Season 2022-2023. He was nominated MVP of the match against Valsa Group Modena for the first time in Italian league.

Clubs 
   (2017–2020)
  Nippon Sport Science University (2020–present)
  Pallavolo Padova (2021–present)

Awards

Individual 
 2020 All Japan High School Volleyball Championships – Most Valuable Player
 2020 All Japan Intercollegiate Volleyball Championship – Best Scorer

High school team 
 2020 All Japan High School Volleyball Championships –  Champion, with Higashiyama High School

College team 
 2020 All Japan Intercollegiate Volleyball Championship –  Runner-up, with Nippon Sport Science University
 2021 Kanto University Men's Division 1 League  –  Champion, with Nippon Sport Science University

External links 

 Japan's men's volleyball team might be out of the Olympics, but its star rookie is going viral on Twitter for his slick moves straight out of sports anime 'Haikyuu!!'

References

2001 births
Living people
Japanese men's volleyball players
Sportspeople from Kyoto Prefecture
Volleyball players at the 2020 Summer Olympics
Olympic volleyball players of Japan
Outside hitters
21st-century Japanese people